Swimming at the 2013 Games of the Small States of Europe was held from 28–31 May 2013 at d'Coque, Luxembourg.

Medal summary

Medal table

Men

Women

References

External links
Site of the 2013 Games of the Small States of Europe
Result book

2013 Games of the Small States of Europe
2013
Games of the Small States of Europe